The Locus Award for Best Fantasy Novel is a literary award given annually by Locus Magazine as part of their Locus Awards.

Winners

References

External links
 The Locus Award Index: Fantasy
 The Locus Award: 2011 winners
 Excerpts and summaries of all Locus winning and nominated fantasy novels

Lists of award winners
Fantasy Novel

hu:Locus-díjas fantasy regények